Muneer Abdullatif Ali (born ) is a Bulgarian-born Qatari male weightlifter, competing in the 62 kg category and representing Qatar at international competitions. He competed at world championships, most recently at the 1999 World Weightlifting Championships. He was born in Bulgaria, one of eight Bulgarian weightlifters recruited by the Qatar Olympic Committee for $1,000,000.

Major results

References

1978 births
Living people
Qatari male weightlifters
Bulgarian male weightlifters
Place of birth missing (living people)
Weightlifters at the 2002 Asian Games
Bulgarian emigrants to Qatar
Converts to Islam from Eastern Orthodoxy
Asian Games competitors for Qatar